The Hulēia National Wildlife Refuge is a National Wildlife Refuge on the island of Kauai in Hawaii. It is adjacent to the Menehune Fish Pond, listed on the National Register of Historic Places, on the southeast side of the island. It was established in 1973 to provide open, productive wetlands as nesting and feeding habitat for endangered Hawaiian waterbirds, including the āeo (Hawaiian stilt, Himantopus mexicanus knudseni), alae kea (Hawaiian coot, Fulica alai), alae ula (Hawaiian gallinule, Gallinula chloropus sandvicensis), and koloa maoli (Hawaiian duck, Anas wyvilliana) can be found here.

To protect and minimize disturbance to the sensitive endangered species that live there, the refuge is closed to all public access. However, shoreline access is provided just to the east at Niumalu Beach Park.

References

External links
Refuge website

National Wildlife Refuges in Hawaii
Protected areas of Kauai
Wetlands of Hawaii
Protected areas established in 1973
Landforms of Kauai
1973 establishments in Hawaii